65th Regiment may refer to:

 65th (2nd Yorkshire, North Riding) Regiment of Foot, a unit of the British Army  
 65th Infantry Regiment (United States), a unit of the United States Army 
 65th Air Defense Artillery Regiment, a unit of the United States Army
 65th Armoured Regiment (India), an armoured unit of the Indian Army

American Civil War regiments
65th Indiana Infantry Regiment, Union Army
65th Illinois Volunteer Infantry Regiment, Union Army
65th New York Volunteer Infantry, Union Army
65th Ohio Infantry, Union Army

See also
 65th Division (disambiguation)
 65th Squadron (disambiguation)